Arne Carlsson, Arne Carlson, Arne Karlson or Arne Karlsson may refer to: 
Arne Carlson (born 1934), American politician
Arne Carlsson (gymnast) (1924–2011), Swedish gymnast
Arne Carlsson (ice hockey) (born 1943), Swedish ice hockey defenceman
Arne Carlsson (speedway rider), Swedish speedway rider
Arne Karlsson (sailor) (born 1936), Swedish sailor
Arne Karlsson (sport shooter) (born 1946), Swedish sports shooter